Maclean is a town in Clarence Valley local government area in the Northern Rivers region of New South Wales, Australia. It is on the Clarence River and near the Pacific Highway. The Maclean, Yamba and Iluka area known as the Lower Clarence had a combined population of 17,533. Its industries are tourism, sugar cane production, farming and river-prawn trawling. Together with Grafton, Maclean is the shared administrative centre for the Clarence Valley Council local government area.

Geography

Maclean is nestled at the base of Mt Maclean and the shoreline of the Clarence River where the river reunites after splitting around Woodford Island. A bridge connects Woodford Island to Maclean. It is part of the Tourist Drive 22. During times of heavy rain the town is under threat of flooding by the surging waters of the river.

The Pacific Highway bypass of Maclean was opened in 1966 in conjunction with the first Harwood Bridge over the South Channel of the Clarence. The bypass was duplicated and the bridge superseded by a four-lane bridge in 2020 (the 1966 bridge has been retained for local traffic).

History
The area was originally inhabited by the Gumbaingirr or Yaygir indigenous peoples. Matthew Flinders landed near the mouth of the Clarence River in 1798.

Cedar cutting began in the area in the 1830s. The Maclean area was known as Rocky Mouth in the 1850s. The township was officially laid out in 1862 and named after Alexander Grant McLean, the Surveyor-General. The sugar industry began to develop around 1865.

Heritage listings 
Maclean has a number of heritage-listed sites, including:
 Clarence River by North Arm: Ulgundahi Island

Culture

The popular Maclean Highland Gathering has been held for over 100 years during the Easter weekend. Participants and bands contest traditional Scottish athletic and cultural competitions, such as caber tossing, highland dancing, band competition, and bagpiping. The "Maclean, The Scottish Town In Australia Association", is a community group which was formed in 1986 under the initiative of former bank manager Mr Graham Leach, and works to promote Maclean's strong Scottish origins. The work of this committee over the years has ensured that Maclean now has national and international recognition as 'The Scottish Town' in Australia.

Many street signs are written in English and Scottish Gaelic, power poles are painted with tartan patterns, and a stone cairn has been erected in Herb Stanford Park.

Schools
 Maclean Public School
 St Joseph's Primary School
 Pacific Valley Christian School
 Maclean High School

Newspapers
The Daily Examiner
The Coastal Views
Clarence Valley Review
The Independent
The Northern Rivers Times

References

External links

Clarence Valley Council Website
Clarence Valley Tourism Website
Maclean, Australian Heritage
Maclean, The Sydney Morning Herald, 8 February 2004

 
Towns in New South Wales
Northern Rivers
Clarence Valley Council